Gora is a rural locality (a village) in Nagornoye Rural Settlement, Petushinsky District, Vladimir Oblast, Russia. The population was 48 as of 2010. There are 2 streets.

Geography 
Gora is located 18 km west of Petushki (the district's administrative centre) by road. Nagorny is the nearest rural locality.

References 

Rural localities in Petushinsky District